Friedrich August Eberhard von Mackensen (24 September 1889 – 19 May 1969) was a German general and war criminal during World War II who served as commander of the 1st Panzer Army and the 14th Army. Following the war, Mackensen stood trial for war crimes before a British military tribunal in Italy where he was convicted and sentenced to death for his involvement in the Ardeatine massacre. The sentence was later commuted and Mackensen was released in 1952. He died in West Germany in 1969.

Early life
Eberhard was born on 24 September 1889, in Bromberg, Kingdom of Prussia, German Empire, the fourth of five children to Field Marshal August von Mackensen and his wife Dorothea (née von Horn). Mackensen joined the Imperial German Army in 1908, where he became a Fahnenjunker (officer candidate) in the XVII Corps stationed in Danzig, and was promoted to lieutenant on 22 March 1910.

Military career
At the outbreak of the First World War in 1914, Mackensen served as a regimental adjutant in the 1st Hussar Regiment. On 25 February 1915, he was promoted to first lieutenant, but after a severe wound on 23 August 1915, Mackensen was transferred to a staff job in the General Staff of the Army Group Scholtz. On 20 May 1917, he was promoted to captain.

Following the armistice in 1918 ending the war, Mackensen remained in the army (now the Reichswehr of the Weimar Republic) where he served as chief of the 1st squadron of the 5th (Prussian) Rider Regiment in Belgard, but in 1919 also joined a right-wing paramilitary Freikorps and fought in the Baltic states. In 1925, Mackensen commanded the army transport department of the German General Staff of the Ministry of the Reichswehr in Berlin. After his appointment as a major on 1 February 1928, he served on the staff of the 1st Cavalry Division in Frankfurt (Oder) from 1930. In this position he was promoted to lieutenant colonel on 1 October 1932.

From 1 November 1933, Mackensen was made chief of the staff of the General Inspectorate of the Cavalry, and was promoted to colonel on 1 September 1934. Mackensen became chief of staff of the X Army Corps in Hamburg, the successor of the cavalry in the newly-formed Wehrmacht. In 1937, Mackensen became commander of the 1st Cavalry Brigade in Insterburg. Mackensen was appointed major general on 1 January 1938, and on 1 May 1939 became commander in the Army Group Command V in Vienna, where he became chief of staff under Field Marshal Wilhelm List. 

At the beginning of World War II in September 1939, Mackensen served as the chief of staff of the German 14th Army in the invasion of Poland. Later, he was made chief of staff of the 12th Army that fought in the Battle of France. On 1 January 1940, he was promoted to lieutenant general and eight months later to General der Kavallerie. On 15 January 1941, Mackensen was made commanding general of III Army Corps, part of the 1st Panzer Army in Army Group South. On 27 July 1941 he received the Knight's Cross of the Iron Cross. Mackensen's forces were the first to reach Kiev at the First Battle of Kiev during the German invasion of the Soviet Union. In November 1942, when General Paul Ewald von Kleist was given the command of Army Group A, Mackensen took up leadership of the 1st Panzer Army in the Third Battle of Kharkov in March 1943. For his achievements in the Second Battle of Kharkov, Mackensen was honored on 26 May 1942 with the oak leaves to his knight's cross, and was promoted to colonel general (Generaloberst) on 6 July 1943. 

Shortly after his promotion to Generaloberst, Mackensen was transferred to Italy as commander of the 14th Army. After the Allies broke through the Winter Line during Operation Diadem, Kesselring fired Mackensen for disobeying orders and the latter retired from active service in the army in the summer of 1944.

Trial and conviction
On 24 March 1944, SS members shot and killed 335 Italian civilians in the Ardeatine Caves massacre in retaliation for the deaths of 32 German police troops in a bomb attack. This war crime was ordered by Adolf Hitler in consultation with Generaloberst Alfred Jodl and Field Marshal Albert Kesselring. Mackensen was at this time commander of the 14th Army and subordinate to Kesselring as well as the superior of Lieutenant-General Kurt Mälzer, military commandant of Rome. All three were convicted of war crimes.

Following the unconditional surrender of Nazi Germany in 1945 Mackensen became a prisoner of war, and on 30 November 1946 was convicted of war crimes by a British military court in Rome, where he was sentenced to death. In mid-1947, his sentence was commuted to 21 years imprisonment. He was released on 2 October 1952 after serving five years. After his release, Mackensen lived a secluded life in Alt Mühlendorf (now in Warder in Rendsburg-Eckernförde district) near Nortorf in Schleswig-Holstein, West Germany.

Death
Mackensen died on 19 May 1969 in Neumünster, aged 79 years old.

Awards
 Iron Cross (1914) 2nd & 1st Class
 Clasp to the Iron Cross 2nd Class (17 September 1939) & 1st Class (2 October 1939)
 Knight's Cross of the Iron Cross with Oak Leaves
 Knight's Cross on 27 July 1941 as General der Kavallerie and commander of III. Armeekorps
 Oak Leaves on 26 May 1942 as General der Kavallerie and commander of III. Armeekorps

References

Citations

Bibliography

External links
 Film of the 1946 trial

1889 births
1969 deaths
Military personnel from Bydgoszcz
German Army personnel of World War I
German untitled nobility
German Army generals of World War II
Colonel generals of the German Army (Wehrmacht)
German mass murderers
Recipients of the Knight's Cross of the Iron Cross with Oak Leaves
Recipients of the clasp to the Iron Cross, 1st class
People from the Province of Posen
Prussian Army personnel
Reichswehr personnel
20th-century Freikorps personnel
Germans convicted of war crimes committed in Italy during World War II
Prisoners sentenced to death by the British military